The 1977 Austrian Grand Prix was a Formula One motor race held at the Österreichring on 14 August 1977. It was the twelfth race of the 1977 World Championship of F1 Drivers and the 1977 International Cup for F1 Constructors.

The race was won by Australian driver and future World Champion, Alan Jones, driving a Shadow-Ford. It was Jones's first Formula One victory, and the only victory for the Shadow team in its eight-year F1 history. Local hero Niki Lauda finished second in his Ferrari, having started from pole position, with West Germany's Hans-Joachim Stuck third in a Brabham-Alfa Romeo.

Qualifying

Qualifying classification

Race

Race report 
Rain had fallen immediately prior to the race start leaving the track wet but would not rain during the race. Tyre choice was split between wets and slicks. Mario Andretti led early until the engine failed in his Lotus 78. The track was drying by this time. Gunnar Nilsson and Jones had starred in the early laps on the wet track. Nilsson moving from 16th to second and Jones progressed from his 14th grid position to fourth. James Hunt became the race leader. Nilsson pitted to replace his ruined wet tyres on his Lotus 78 while Jones moved past Hans-Joachim Stuck's Brabham and Jody Scheckter's Wolf WR3 into second position. Jones would not have progressed further but for an engine failure in Hunt's McLaren M26 late in the race. Nilsson recovered from his pitstop to third until an engine failure claimed its second Lotus of the day. Lauda's poor handling Ferrari came on as the track dried and he moved into second while Stuck survived to claim the final podium position. Scheckter spun off leaving Carlos Reutemann in the second Ferrari 312T2 to finish fourth ahead of Ronnie Peterson in the Tyrrell P34 and the second McLaren of Jochen Mass claimed the final championship point in sixth. Despite the changeable condition, 16 cars finished the race with 17 classified. The seventeenth was Emilio de Villota, who crashed his privately entered McLaren M23 in the closing stages while on his 51st lap.

It had been seven years since the last victory by an Australian (Jack Brabham in the 1970 South African Grand Prix). Jones' win had no effect on the championship points race. Lauda's second place, coupled with retirements to Scheckter, Andretti and Hunt significantly strengthened Lauda's grip on the championship, expanding his lead to 16 points.

Classification

Championship standings after the race

Drivers' Championship standings

Constructors' Championship standings

References

Austrian Grand Prix
Grand Prix
Austrian Grand Prix